Uruti is a locality in northern Taranaki, in the North Island of New Zealand. It is located on State Highway 3, north-east of Mimi and south-west of Ahititi. The Uruti Stream meets the Mimi River at this point. The river flows past the settlement into the North Taranaki Bight.

A district nurse was appointed to serve the backblocks of the Uruti Valley in 1909. This was the first district nursing service in New Zealand.

The Uruti tunnel links the Uruti Valley with the main highway. It was completed in 1923 and is the longest and most unstable tunnel in Taranaki.

The 1984 film Vigil was filmed at Uruti. Much of the 2003 film The Last Samurai was filmed in the Uruti Valley, with Mount Taranaki/Egmont standing in for Mount Fuji.

Demographics

Mount Messenger had a population of 864 at the 2018 New Zealand census, an increase of 42 people (5.1%) since the 2013 census, and an increase of 108 people (14.3%) since the 2006 census. There were 309 households, comprising 441 males and 423 females, giving a sex ratio of 1.04 males per female. The median age was 42.0 years (compared with 37.4 years nationally), with 216 people (25.0%) aged under 15 years, 117 (13.5%) aged 15 to 29, 420 (48.6%) aged 30 to 64, and 111 (12.8%) aged 65 or older.

Ethnicities were 88.2% European/Pākehā, 22.6% Māori, 1.0% Pacific peoples, 1.7% Asian, and 2.8% other ethnicities. People may identify with more than one ethnicity.

The percentage of people born overseas was 9.4, compared with 27.1% nationally.

Although some people chose not to answer the census's question about religious affiliation, 54.9% had no religion, 32.3% were Christian, 1.0% had Māori religious beliefs, 0.3% were Hindu and 1.0% had other religions.

Of those at least 15 years old, 75 (11.6%) people had a bachelor's or higher degree, and 162 (25.0%) people had no formal qualifications. The median income was $30,500, compared with $31,800 nationally. 78 people (12.0%) earned over $70,000 compared to 17.2% nationally. The employment status of those at least 15 was that 333 (51.4%) people were employed full-time, 117 (18.1%) were part-time, and 21 (3.2%) were unemployed.

Education
Uruti School is a coeducational full primary (years 1-8) school with a roll of  students as of  The school celebrated its centennial in 1998.

Notes

Further reading

General historical works

Business

Schools

New Plymouth District
Populated places in Taranaki